The Women's lightweight double sculls event at the 2010 South American Games was held over March 22 at 10:20.

Medalists

Records

Results

References
Final

Lightweight Double Scull W